Tommy Kristensen (born 6 November 1939) is a Danish racewalker. He competed in the 20 kilometres walk at the 1960 Summer Olympics and the 1964 Summer Olympics.

References

1939 births
Living people
Athletes (track and field) at the 1960 Summer Olympics
Athletes (track and field) at the 1964 Summer Olympics
Danish male racewalkers
Olympic athletes of Denmark
Place of birth missing (living people)